Timeless Jazz is an album by saxophonist Coleman Hawkins which was recorded in 1954 for the mail order Jazztone label and rereleased as Jazz Tones on Xanadu Records in 1982.

Reception

Ken Dryden on AllMusic states, "This 1954 studio date by Coleman Hawkins finds the tenor saxophonist in great form ... There are many strong solos by the supporting cast, but it's difficult to eclipse the sound of Hawkins' tenor when he is in top form".

Track listing
All compositions by Coleman Hawkins except where noted.
 "Cheek to Cheek" (Irving Berlin) – 7:56
 "Lullaby of Birdland" (George Shearing, George David Weiss) – 5:10
 "If I Had You" (Irving King, Ted Shapiro) – 4:29
 "Get Happy" (Harold Arlen, Ted Koehler) – 5:29
 "Honeysuckle Rose" (Fats Waller, Andy Razaf) – 2:59 Additional track not on original release
 "Blue Lou" (Edgar Sampson, Irving Mills) – 4:59
 "Out of Nowhere" (Johnny Green, Edward Heyman) – 5:38
 "Undecided" (Charlie Shavers, Sid Robin) – 4:46 Additional track not on original release
 "Stompin' at the Savoy" (Sampson, Razaf, Benny Goodman, Chick Webb) – 6:10
 "Ain't Misbehavin'" (Fats Waller, Harry Brooks, Razaf) – 7:26
 "Just You, Just Me" (Jesse Greer, Raymond Klages) – 6:03
 "Time on My Hands" (Vincent Youmans, Harold Adamson, Mack Gordon) – 7:42 Additional track not on original release

Personnel
Coleman Hawkins – tenor saxophone
Emmett Berry – trumpet
Eddie Bert – trombone
Billy Taylor – piano
Milt Hinton – bass
Jo Jones – drums

References

Coleman Hawkins albums
1955 albums
Xanadu Records albums